This is a list of life peerages in the Peerage of the United Kingdom created under the Life Peerages Act 1958 since 2010, during the tenures of Conservative prime ministers David Cameron, Theresa May, Boris Johnson, Liz Truss and Rishi Sunak.

Queen Elizabeth II died on 8 September 2022, two days after appointing Truss. All subsequent peerages were created by King Charles III.



David Cameron (2010–2016)

† recommended by House of Lords Appointments Commission
 ‡ former MP  # former MEP

Theresa May (2016–2019)

† recommended by House of Lords Appointments Commission
 ‡ former MP  # former MEP

Boris Johnson (2019–2022)

† recommended by House of Lords Appointments Commission
 ‡ former MP  # former MEP

Liz Truss (2022)

Rishi Sunak (2022–present)

‡ former MP

See also
 List of life peerages
 List of hereditary peers in the House of Lords by virtue of a life peerage

References

Notes

2010-present
2010s in the United Kingdom
2020s in the United Kingdom